The 2012 Hall of Fame Tennis Championships (also known as the Campbell's Hall of Fame Tennis Championships for sponsorship reasons) was a men's tennis tournament played on outdoor grass courts. It was the 37th edition of the Hall of Fame Tennis Championships, and was part of the ATP World Tour 250 series of the 2012 ATP World Tour. It took place at the International Tennis Hall of Fame in Newport, Rhode Island, United States, from July 9 through July 15, 2012. John Isner won the singles title.

Finals

Singles

 John Isner defeated  Lleyton Hewitt, 7–6(7–1), 6–4

Doubles

 Santiago González /  Scott Lipsky defeated  Colin Fleming /  Ross Hutchins, 7–6(7–3), 6–3

Singles main draw entrants

Seeds

 1 Seedings are based on the rankings of June 25, 2012

Other entrants
The following players received wildcards into the singles main draw:
  Ryan Harrison
  Lleyton Hewitt
  Jack Sock

The following players received entry from the qualifying draw:
  Benjamin Becker
  Sergei Bubka
  Tim Smyczek
  Izak van der Merwe

Withdrawals
  Benjamin Becker (shoulder injury)

Doubles main draw entrants

Seeds

 Rankings are as of June 25, 2012

Other entrants
The following pairs received wildcards into the doubles main draw:
  Chris Guccione /  Lleyton Hewitt
  Steve Johnson /  Denis Kudla
The following pair received entry as alternates:
  Raven Klaasen /  Izak van der Merwe

Withdrawals
  Benjamin Becker (shoulder injury)

References

External links
Official website